Günter Lenz (born 25 July 1938) is a German jazz bassist and composer.

Activities 
Lenz was born in Frankfurt am Main. He first taught himself guitar and studied with Carlo Bohländer, playing jazz in the clubs of the U.S. Army from 1954 onwards. During national service in 1959/1960  he switched to the bass. In 1961 Albert Mangelsdorff picked him up as member of the Albert Mangelsdorff Quintet. Since then Lenz has also become a member of the "hr-jazz ensemble," for which he  arranged and composed too. In 1965 he worked in the quintet of Krzysztof Komeda, taking part in the recording of the album Astigmatic. In 1968 he played with Joachim Kühn and Aldo Romano in a band led by Barney Wilen at the Berlin Jazz Days. With The German All Stars he toured internationally in 1969 and 1971. He played with the George Russell Sextet, and also with a band led by Leon Thomas. This allowed him to collect big band experience. During the 1970s he was a member of the Kurt Edelhagen Big Band (1972) and of Peter Herbolzheimer Rhythm Combination & Brass (Scenes (Live At Ronnie Scott's Club). Chet Baker, Coleman Hawkins, Oliver Nelson and Benny Bailey engaged him for their concert tours and record productions, as well as German musicians such as Eugen Cicero, Horst Jankowski and Volker Kriegel. 1972 Günter Lenz played with Lightning Hopkins. 

In the mid-1970s, Lenz joined with the drummer Peter Giger in "Clarinet Contrast", an avantgarde band around the clarinetists Perry Robinson, Theo Jörgensmann, Bernd Konrad and Michel Pilz. As a member of the Manfred Schoof Quintet he recorded for ECM/Japo.

In the late 1970s he founded his combo Günter Lenz Springtime, an international jazz-fusion band with members as Bob Degen, Claus Stötter, Frank St. Peter, Johannes Faber, Leszek Zadlo and Joe Nay. 

Lenz recorded as part of the Berlin Contemporary Jazz Orchestra. In 1991 he recorded "Life at the Montreux Music Festival" in trio-formation with Uli Lenz and Allen Blairman

Lenz also created orchestral arrangements for Plácido Domingo. From 2001 to 2006 he taught as a bass professor at the Musikhochschule Stuttgart.

In 2004 Lenz received the Hesse state Jazz prize awarded by the State Minister for Higher Education, Research and the Arts Udo Corts.

Discography
 Komeda, Stańko, Namysłowski, Lenz:Astigmatic (Polonia Records, 1998, rec. 1965)
 The German All Stars: In Südamerika (CBS 1969, with Ack van Rooyen, Manfred Schoof, Albert Mangelsdorff, Rudi Füsers, Rolf Kühn, Emil Mangelsdorff, Gerd Dudek, Heinz Sauer, Wolfgang Dauner, Ralf Hübner, Willie Johanns) 
 The German All Stars: Live at the Domicile (MPS Records 1971, with Ack van Rooyen, Manfred Schoof, Albert Mangelsdorff, Rudi Füsers, Emil Mangelsdorff, Michel Pilz, Heinz Sauer, Wolfgang Dauner, Ralf Hübner, Willie Johanns) 
 Beebelaar, Joos, Lenz: Book of Family Affairs (HGBS, 2013)

With Springtime 
 Znel (Mood Records 1978)
 Roaring Plenties (L+R Records, 1980)
 Majorleague (L+R Records, 1992)
 Strict Minimum (JazzWerkstatt 2007) 

With hr-Jazzensemble
 Colin Wilkie, Shirley Hart, Albert Mangelsdorff, Joki Freund und das Jazz-Ensemble des Hessischen Rundfunks Wild Goose (MPS Records 1969)
 Atmospheric Conditions Permitting (ECM, 1967–1993)
 Perpetual Questions (HR-Musik, 1996–2004)
 Unauffällige Festansage (JazzWerkstatt 2005–2008)

As Sideman
 Albert Mangelsdorff Quintett: Tension (CBS, 1963)
 Albert Mangelsdorff Quintett: Now Jazz Ramwong (CBS, 1964)
 Albert Mangelsdorff Quintett: Folk Mond and Flower Dream (CBS, 1967)
 Albert Mangelsdorff Quartett: Never Let It End (MPS, 1970)
 Leon Thomas: Leon Thomas in Berlin (Flying Dutchman, 1971) with Oliver Nelson
 Heinz Sauer Quartet: Cherry Bat (Enja, 1989)
 Berlin Contemporary Jazz Orchestra: Berlin Contemporary Jazz Orchestra (ECM, 1990)

Literature 
 Ulfert Goeman Der Bassist und Komponist Günter Lenz wurde siebzig Jazz Podium 11/2008: 39-41
 U. Andis: Günter Lenz’s Springtime,, Jazz Podium, 40/10 (1991), 40
 Martin Kunzler: Jazz-Lexikon. Band 1: A–L (= rororo-Sachbuch. Bd. 16512). 2. Auflage. Rowohlt, Reinbek bei Hamburg 2004, .
 Wolfgang Sandner (ed.): Jazz in Frankfurt Frankfurt a.M: Societäts-Verlag 1990, 
 Carlo Bohländer, Karl Heinz Holler, Christian Pfarr: Reclam´s Jazzführer, 3. edition, Reclam, Stuttgart 1989, p. 206

References

External links 
  Günter Lenz at myspace
 

1938 births
Living people
Male double-bassists
German bass guitarists
Male bass guitarists
Musicians from Frankfurt
German jazz composers
Male jazz composers
People from Hesse-Nassau
Academic staff of the State University of Music and Performing Arts Stuttgart
21st-century double-bassists
21st-century German male musicians
Clarinet Contrast members
German male guitarists